Steven J. Sasson (born July 4, 1950) is an American electrical engineer and the inventor of the self-contained (portable) digital camera. Sasson is a 1972 (BS) and 1973 (MS) graduate of Rensselaer Polytechnic Institute in electrical engineering. He attended and graduated from Brooklyn Technical High School. He joined Kodak shortly after his graduation from engineering school and retired from Kodak in 2009.

First self-contained digital camera
Steven Sasson developed a portable, battery operated, self-contained digital camera at Kodak in 1975. The images were digitally recorded onto a cassette tape, a process that took 23 seconds per image. His camera took images in black-and-white. As he set out on his design project, what he envisioned for the future was a camera without mechanical moving parts (although his device did have moving parts, such as the tape drive).

In 1977, Kodak filed a patent application on some features of Sasson's prototype camera.   Titled "electronic still camera", the patent listed Sasson and Gareth Llyod as co-inventors.   The issued patent, U.S. patent number 4,131,919. claims an arrangement that allows the CCD to be read out quickly ("in real time") into a temporary buffer of random-access memory, and then written to storage at the lower speed of the storage device.  Most modern digital cameras still use such an arrangement, which was also described in an earlier MIT patent that employed a vidicon sensor rather than a CCD.

His prototype was not the first camera that produced digital images, but was the first hand-held digital camera. Earlier examples of digital cameras included some cameras used for astronomical photography, experimental devices by Michael Francis Tompsett et al., and the commercial product and hobbyist camera called the Cromemco Cyclops.

Life and career
Sasson was born in Brooklyn, New York, the son of Ragnhild Tomine (Endresen) and John Vincent Sasson. His mother was Norwegian. His work on digital cameras began in 1975 with a broad assignment from his supervisor at Eastman Kodak Company, Gareth A. Lloyd: to attempt to build an electronic camera using a commercially available charge coupled device (CCD). The resulting camera invention was awarded the U.S. patent number 4,131,919.

Sasson retired from Eastman Kodak Company in 2009, and began working as a consultant in an intellectual property protection role. Sasson joined the University of South Florida Institute for Advanced Discovery & Innovation in 2018, where he is a member and courtesy professor.

On November 17, 2009, U.S. President Barack Obama awarded Sasson the National Medal of Technology and Innovation at a ceremony in the East Room of the White House. This is the highest honor awarded by the US government to scientists, engineers, and inventors. On September 6, 2012 The Royal Photographic Society awarded Sasson its Progress Medal and Honorary Fellowship "in recognition of any invention, research, publication or other contribution that has resulted in an important advance in the scientific or technological development of photography or imaging in the widest sense."

Leica Camera AG honored Sasson by presenting to him a limited edition 18-megapixel Leica M9 Titanium camera at the Photokina 2010 trade show event.

Sasson was inducted into the National Inventors Hall of Fame in 2011 , and later elected as a Fellow of the National Academy of Inventors in 2018.

Patents
 Patent – Electronic Still camera

References

External links
The Dawn of Digital Photography - interview with Steven Sasson on the invention of the digital camera 
Disruptive Innovation: The Story of the First Digital Camera, lecture by Steven Sasson at the Linda Hall Library (October 26, 2011)

1950 births
Living people
20th-century American inventors
21st-century American inventors
Digital photography
Kodak people
People from Brooklyn
American electrical engineers
Rensselaer Polytechnic Institute alumni
Place of birth missing (living people)
Brooklyn Technical High School alumni
American people of Norwegian descent
Engineers from New York (state)